The following is a list of active lighthouses in Italy, sorted by region.

Abruzzo
This is a list of lighthouses in Abruzzo.

Apulia
This is a list of lighthouses in Apulia.

Calabria
This is a list of lighthouses in Calabria.

Campania

This is a list of lighthouses in Campania.

Emilia Romagna
This is a list of lighthouses in Emilia Romagna.

(1) Light visible in the satellite view not in 3D

Friuli-Venezia Giulia

This is a list of lighthouses in Friuli-Venezia Giulia.

Lazio
This is a list of lighthouses in Lazio.

Liguria
This is a list of lighthouses in Liguria.

Marche

This is a list of lighthouses in Marche.

Molise
This is a list of lighthouses in Molise.

Sardinia
This is a list of lighthouses in Sardinia.

Sicily
This is a list of lighthouses in Sicily.

Tuscany
This is a list of lighthouses in Tuscany.

Veneto
This is a list of lighthouses in Veneto'''.

See also
 Lists of lighthouses and lightvessels
 Marina Militare

References

External links

 

 
Lighthouses
Water transport in Italy
Italy
Lighthouses